The Violin sonata in D major (HWV 371) was composed (c. 1749-50) by George Frideric Handel, for violin and basso continuo. Other catalogues of Handel's music have referred to the work as HG ; and HHA .

This sonata represents Handel's last piece of chamber music. The piece was not published by Walsh. The designation Opus 1 No.13 was first made in the Chrysander edition.

A typical performance of the work takes about twelve minutes.

Movements
The work consists of four movements:

See also
List of solo sonatas by George Frideric Handel
XV Handel solo sonatas (publication by Chrysander)

References

Violin sonatas by George Frideric Handel
Handel
Compositions in D major